Seán Cullinane (born 1966) is a retired Irish hurler who formerly played with Passage at club level and with Waterford at inter-county level.

Seán was both Passage and Waterford's number one full back for the late 1990s and at the start of the 2000s.  Seán's final match for Waterford came on 11 June 2001 against Limerick at Páirc Uí Chaoimh.  Seán's inter-county career finished on a sour note, losing to Limerick by 3 points, after having led the match by 11 points after 16 minutes.  Since Seán's retirement, it can be said that Waterford GAA have failed to successfully replace him at full back with a number of players such as Tom Feeney, Kevin Moran, Declan Prendergast and Ken McGrath all having been tried out at the position.

Seán had a frustrating club career with Passage having lost three Waterford Senior Hurling Championship finals, most notably in the 1993 final, having lost to Lismore GAA by a single point in an incredibly wet and windy day in Walsh Park.  While Seán's final match for Waterford was a disappointment, his last match for Passage was more of a fairytale ending.  At the age of 38, Seán came on as a sub in the 2007 Waterford Intermediate Hurling Championship final where Passage beat Dungarvan by 6 points.  This ensured that Passage would be back playing senior hurling in 2008.

Seán having now finished as a player at senior level, is head trainer at Passage.

In addition, he was announced as the second shock replacement in a week for the Waterford senior management team, alongside Kend Mcgrath for Nicky Cashin. Seán will act as defensive selector and coach under Michael Ryan for the 2012 season, replacing Br. Philip Ryan of Mt.Sion from 26/03/2012 onwards.

Honours
 Munster Senior Hurling Championship runner-up - 1989, 1998
 Waterford Intermediate Hurling Championship winner - 2007
 Waterford Junior Hurling Championship winner - 2009
 Waterford Senior Hurling Championship runner-up - 1993, 1994 and 1997

Championship Appearances

References

1969 births
Living people
Waterford inter-county hurlers
Passage (Waterford) hurlers